Vivekananda College for Women, established in 1961, is an undergraduate and postgraduate women's college in Barisha, Calcutta, West Bengal India. It is affiliated with the University of Calcutta.

Departments

Science
Chemistry
Physics
Mathematics
Botany
Zoology
Anthropology
Statistics
Psychology
film makin
fashion designing

Arts

Bengali
English..*Sanskrit
History
Geography
Political Science
Philosophy
Economics
Education
Sociology
Music

Accreditation
The college is recognized by the University Grants Commission (UGC). In 2006 it was accredited by the National Assessment and Accreditation Council (NAAC), and awarded B++ grade, an accreditation that has since then expired.

See also 
List of colleges affiliated to the University of Calcutta
Education in India
Education in West Bengal

References

External links
Vivekananda College for Women

Educational institutions established in 1961
University of Calcutta affiliates
Universities and colleges in Kolkata
Women's universities and colleges in West Bengal
1961 establishments in West Bengal